Eric Sherbeck (born August 7, 1957) is an American former professional tennis player.

Biography
Sherbeck was born in Missoula, Montana, the son of Hal Sherbeck, an athletics coach at the University of Montana. Early in his childhood the family moved to California and his father began a famed career as the athletic director and football coach at Fullerton College. After graduating from El Dorado High School, Sherbeck went to Arizona State University, where he was the No. 1 singles player in the varsity tennis team. He graduated with a business administration degree in 1980, then turned to professional tennis.

Primarily as a doubles specialist, Sherbeck competed on the international tennis circuit until 1985. He did however appear in the main draw in the singles at the Australian Open on three occasions, with his performance in the 1982 Australian Open his best result, eliminated by eventual champion Johan Kriek in the third round. In doubles he also made the third round at the 1983 Australian Open with David Pate, a run which also ended at the hands of the tournament winners, Mark Edmondson and Paul McNamee. They came close to an upset win and quarter-final berth, only losing 6–8 in the final set. He won one Grand Prix doubles title, at the 1983 South Australian Open in Adelaide, with a local player Craig Miller.

In 1985 he took over from Buff Bogard coaching the men's Cal State Fullerton Titans Tennis team as head coach.

His elder brother, David Sherbeck, was also a tennis player who represented the University of Utah and later appeared at Wimbledon.

Grand Prix career finals

Doubles: 1 (1–0)

Challenger titles

Doubles: (1)

References

External links
 
 

1957 births
Living people
American male tennis players
Arizona State Sun Devils men's tennis players
Cal State Fullerton Titans men's tennis coaches
Sportspeople from Missoula, Montana
Tennis people from California
American tennis coaches